Lawrence Timothy "Buck" Shaw (March 28, 1899 – March 19, 1977) was an American football player and coach. He was the head coach for Santa Clara University, the University of California, Berkeley, the San Francisco 49ers, the United States Air Force Academy and the Philadelphia Eagles. He attended the University of Notre Dame, where he became a star player on Knute Rockne's first unbeaten team. He started his coaching career with one year as head coach at North Carolina State and four years as a line coach at Nevada in Reno.

At Santa Clara, he compiled an impressive  record; his first two teams posted consecutive Sugar Bowl wins over LSU. After war-time service, his only team at California went 4–5–1 in 1945. In 1946, Shaw became the San Francisco 49ers' first head coach in the old All-America Football Conference (AAFC) and continued through 1954; they entered the National Football League (NFL) in from 1950.  After two seasons as the first Air Force Academy varsity head coach (1956–1957), he returned to the NFL in 1958 with Philadelphia. In 1960, he led the team to an NFL Championship victory against Vince Lombardi, who said of Shaw, “That right there is a good man...an honest man.” He stepped down after three seasons, following their win in the championship game over Vince Lombardi's Green Bay Packers; Shaw ended up being the only coach to have beaten Lombardi in a playoff game. Nicknamed "the Silver Fox", Shaw had a winning record in ten of his twelve seasons as a professional football coach while reaching the Championship Game in two different leagues and winning 62% of his games.

Early life
One of five children (brothers Bill, Jim, and John, and sister Mary), the family moved to Stuart when Shaw was ten, where high school football had been abolished because of a fatality. He played only four games as a prep after the sport was brought back in 1917, his senior year.

College
Shaw enrolled at Creighton University in Omaha in the fall of 1918 and went out for football; he played one game before the rest of the schedule wiped out by the flu epidemic. He transferred to the University of Notre Dame in 1919. Shaw apparently loved track and field competition. In fact it was track, not football that attracted him to Notre Dame. He enrolled at South Bend and went out for the track team. However, Shaw fell into the hands of Knute Rockne and became one of the greatest tackles and placekickers in Notre Dame history.

Shaw was a starter for Rockne from 1919 to 1921, first at left tackle and then in 1920 and 1921 as right tackle opening holes for George Gipp. He finished his playing career being selected an All-American by Football World Magazine.  Shaw also set a record by converting 38 of 39 extra points during his varsity career, a mark that stood until 1976, more than 50 years after he graduated. Shaw is a member of the all-time "Fighting Irish" football team.

Coaching career

College
In the spring of Shaw's senior year at Notre Dame, Rockne came to Shaw with a couple of letters from schools seeking coaches, one from Auburn University in Alabama, and another from the University of Nevada in Reno.

Although he started his coaching career at North Carolina State in 1924, he apparently did not want to go further south to Auburn. He heard from a friend at Notre Dame who was from Nevada that American football was new out there; they'd been playing rugby before. In a 1970 interview, Shaw said, "It sounded like an interesting challenge, so I took the Nevada job as line coach."

Shaw was at Nevada for four years, then took a job with an oil firm and wanted to stay out of the coaching field, but was talked into becoming an assistant coach at Santa Clara University by his old teammate, Clipper Smith. He was line coach under Smith from 1929 to 1935; during the first season, the stock market crashed. "I had a heck of a time getting on my feet," explained Shaw, "Santa Clara could only afford to hire us on a seasonal basis in those years, and I was working for Standard Oil when I became head coach in 1936 after Clipper resigned to go to Villanova".

Shaw's first two Bronco teams (1936 and 1937) went a combined 18–1, including back-to-back wins in New Orleans over local favorite LSU in the Sugar Bowl in January 1937 and 1938.  Possibly the first major coach to "phone-it-in" when because of an illness, he did not travel with the team but coached them to victory over the telephone. Santa Clara dropped football after the 1942 war-time season, and Shaw stayed on campus for two years to assist the Army's physical education program on campus.

Shaw, while waiting for the professional All-America Football Conference to get off the ground, managed to mold California into a representative team and defeated a Frankie Albert-led St. Mary's Pre-Flight team, 6–0. It was a losing season overall for the Bears, but they had a good bunch of players, Shaw and his staff remarked after the 1945 season.

The second Air Force Academy varsity head football coach, Shaw guided the Falcons to a 6–2–1 mark in 1956 and a 3–6–1 record in 1957.

Professional
Shaw was the San Francisco 49ers’ first head coach, working with such pro luminaries as Frankie Albert, Y. A. Tittle and Hugh McElhenny. In 1944 and 1945, before World War II ended, the Morabito brothers, Victor and Tony, began organizing the San Francisco 49ers for entry into a new professional league, the All-America Football Conference (AAFC). Shaw and his assistant, Al Ruffo, were hired by the 49ers, but then were permitted to accept a one-year contract at California when the AAFC league kickoff was delayed until 1946. In 1946, Shaw took over the 49ers, and with the left-handed Frankie Albert leading and directing the attack, the team placed second to the Cleveland Browns four times (1946–1949) in the Western Division of the AAFC.  In 1950, the 49ers along with the Browns and the Baltimore Colts merged with the rival NFL. Shaw was fired on December 13, 1954 despite the 49ers finishing third at 7&dash;4&dash;1 in the NFL Western Conference. His record in nine years at the helm was 71&dash;39&dash;4.

In 1958, Shaw took over a last-place Philadelphia Eagles team and started rebuilding. He immediately dealt Buck Lansford, Jimmy Harris, and a first-round draft choice to the Los Angeles Rams for 32-year-old, nine-year veteran quarterback Norm Van Brocklin. Shaw and Van Brocklin led the Eagles to the NFL championship in 1960 with a 17–13 victory at Franklin Field over Vince Lombardi's Green Bay Packers, the only time the Lombardi-era Packers lost a postseason game. The contest ended on a game-saving tackle of Green Bay's Jim Taylor inside then ten-yard line.  It was made by center/linebacker "sixty-minute-man" Chuck Bednarik, who because of early season injuries at linebacker revived, at Shaw's request, the long-discarded concept of two-way football.

After winning the 1960 championship, the 61-year-old Coach Shaw retired, saying "I wanted to get out while I was ahead." In the quiet Green Bay dressing room, Lombardi said he was "happy for Buck". "Seeing he's going to retire, that's a nice note for him to go out on." Shaw was the oldest head coach to win an NFL championship for over 39 years, until Dick Vermeil's victory with the St. Louis Rams in Super Bowl XXXIV in early 2000.

Later life and legacy
After retiring from coaching, Shaw returned to California to work for a paper products company, and spent the later years of his life in Menlo Park.  He and his wife had two married daughters who also lived in California.

In 1962, led by Sal Sanfilippo (SCU '30, J.D. SCU '32), former players, friends, and fans of Shaw banded together to form the Bronco Bench Foundation to raise money for and build a football stadium on the Santa Clara University campus in his honor.  On September 22, 1962, the first football game, a contest between Santa Clara and UC Davis, was played in Buck Shaw Stadium.

Shaw died of cancer on March 19, 1977, aged 77, at Stanford University's Branch Convalescent Hospital.

Head coaching record

College

Professional (AAFC/NFL)

References

 Much of the information in this article comes from John C. Hibner's biography of Coach Shaw in The College Football Historical Society's Newsletter Vol. II, No. I, Nov. 1988  and the  Des Moines (Ia.) Register  1970 article

External links
 

1899 births
1977 deaths
American football tackles
Air Force Falcons football coaches
California Golden Bears football coaches
Creighton Bluejays football players
NC State Wolfpack football coaches
Nevada Wolf Pack football coaches
Notre Dame Fighting Irish football players
Philadelphia Eagles coaches
San Francisco 49ers coaches
San Francisco 49ers head coaches
Santa Clara Broncos football coaches
College Football Hall of Fame inductees
Sportspeople from Des Moines, Iowa
People from Menlo Park, California
People from Stuart, Iowa
Coaches of American football from Iowa
Players of American football from Des Moines, Iowa
Deaths from cancer in California
Philadelphia Eagles head coaches